Alexandra "Sasha" Alexeyevna Luss is a Russian model and actress best known for portraying Anna Poliatova in the 2019 film Anna.

Early life 
Luss was born in Magadan, Magadan Oblast, and moved to Moscow at a young age. As a child, she had no interest in pursuing a modelling career, preferring to spend her time writing and dancing. She frequently participated in ballet competitions before she suffered an ankle injury which prevented her from continuing her hobby. Her mother's friends and even strangers would compliment Sasha's modelling potential. When Sasha was 13 years old, her mother took her to visit a modelling agency, where she was signed. Luss has stated that her grandmother disapproved of this career move, claiming that modelling is a terrible, immoral business.

Career

Modelling
She signed with DNA Model Management, which flew her to Europe and New York, where she walked in fashion shows for designers such as DKNY and Antonio Marras. Despite these successful bookings, her career failed to take off, and she returned to Russia to complete her education. Luss decided to sign with Elite Model Management in Paris and Women Management in Milan as a development model and, in 2011, left her mother agency, IQ Models, to join Avant Models.

In 2011, Luss was spotted by Karl Lagerfeld in an advertisement for the Russian demi-couturier Bohemique. Lagerfeld was so impressed by her, he decided to cast her in his Chanel pre-Fall 2012 and Fall/Winter 2012 shows. The following season, she was snapped up by Dior to walk exclusively in their Spring/Summer 2013 show. She walked in 58 shows during the Autumn/Winter 2013 season for some of the world's most prestigious brands, such as Prada, Valentino, Calvin Klein, Louis Vuitton and Givenchy. She was selected as one of the top newcomers of the season by models.com. Following her impressive runway presence, she was chosen to star in ad campaigns for Carolina Herrera, Max Mara, Valentino and Tommy Hilfiger. Luss decided to bleach her hair platinum blonde, which was a significant moment in her career. Her new-found elven beauty was adored by designers and inspired other models to emulate her look. Luss walked in another 53 fashion shows during Spring/Summer 2014, cementing her position as one of the most in-demand models of the moment. She was awarded the honor "Model of the Year" by Glamour Russia in 2013.

She was photographed for Lanvin and Chanel by her long-time supporter Karl Lagerfeld for the fashion house's Spring/Summer 2014 ad campaigns. Shortly after this, Luss landed the biggest job of her career, as the new face of Dior Beauty. Luss starred in the 2014 Autumn Versace Jeans AD Campaign. She has selected by casting director Jennifer Starr for the Steven Meisel photographed 2015 Pirelli Calendar.

Film
In 2017, Luss played Princess Lihö-Minaa in the film Valerian and the City of a Thousand Planets.  In 2019, she starred in the title role of the action thriller film Anna as a Russian agent who goes undercover as a model.

In January 2022, it was announced that Luss would co-star in Jordan Gertner's new film Sheroes, to be filmed in January and February in Thailand.

Filmography

Film

References

External links 
Sasha Luss at Dom Models MAG
Sasha Luss at the FMD
Sasha Luss at Models.com
Sasha Luss at Supermodels.nl
Sasha Luss on Instagram

1992 births
Living people
People from Magadan
Russian female models
Russian film actresses
Russian television actresses
Russian voice actresses
Russian stage actresses
IMG Models models
21st-century Russian actresses
Russian expatriates in Canada